CREB regulated transcription coactivator 2, also known as CRTC2, is a protein which in humans is encoded by the CRTC2 gene.

Function 

CRTC2, initially called TORC2, is a transcriptional coactivator for the transcription factor CREB and a central regulator of 
gluconeogenic gene expression in response to cAMP. CRTC2 is thought to drive tumorigenesis in LKB11/STK11-null non-small cell lung cancers (NSCLC).

Interactions 

CRTC2 has been shown to interact with SNF1LK2 and YWHAQ.

References

Further reading

External links 
 
 
 
 

Gene expression
Transcription coregulators